The 1919 Georgia Bulldogs baseball team represented the Georgia Bulldogs of the University of Georgia in the 1919 NCAA baseball season.

Schedule and results

One game (a loss) not accounted for in Media Guide.

References

Georgia
Georgia Bulldogs baseball seasons
Southern Intercollegiate Athletic Association baseball champion seasons
Georgia Bull